Tony Scoggo (born Anthony Scoggins on 6 May 1936) is a British actor best known for his role in the television soap opera Brookside. He played Matty Nolan in the series from 1982 to 1992.

Other TV roles include: Boys from the Blackstuff and Doctor Who (in the serial Terror of the Vervoids).

Scoggins developed an interest in politics while working on the Vauxhall Community Development Project in the early 1970s. He gave up acting in the 1990s to become councillor in Knowsley. As a Labour councillor, Tony took part in the Knowsley Metropolitan Borough Council elections of 1999, 2003 and 2004. In 2003, he was Knowsley Council's Cabinet Member for Leisure, Community and Culture.

References

External links
 

Male actors from Liverpool
Living people
British male soap opera actors
1936 births
Place of birth missing (living people)